Ptinus rufipes is a species of beetle in the family Ptinidae (spider beetles). P. rufipes is one of at least eleven species of ptinid in the subgenus Bruchoptinus. The subgenus was first described by Edmund Reitter in 1884.

Gallery

References

rufipes
Beetles of Europe
Beetles described in 1790
Taxa named by Guillaume-Antoine Olivier